The Savoy Declaration is a Congregationalist confession of Faith. Its full title is A Declaration of the Faith and Order owned and practised in the Congregational Churches in England. It was drawn up in October 1658 by English Independents and Congregationalists meeting at the Savoy Hospital, London.

History 
The Savoy Assembly (not to be confused with the Savoy Conference a few years later) met at the Savoy for eleven or twelve days from 12 October 1658. Representatives, mostly laymen, were present from more than one hundred independent churches. Thomas Goodwin, who was a Westminster divine and author of the Westminster Confession of Faith, and John Owen were the leaders in a committee of six divines appointed to draw up a confession. The writers were influenced by the Cambridge Platform, which was the statement of church government produced by the Congregational churches in New England. The 1647 Westminster Confession of Faith of the Church of England was used as a basic template.

Contents

Thomas Goodwin, author of the Westminster Confession of Faith, saw the Savoy Declaration as a revision of the Westminster Confession with the "latest and best". The Savoy Declaration authors adopted, with a few alterations, the doctrinal definitions of the Westminster confession, reconstructing only the part relating to church government; the main effect of the Declaration of the Savoy assembly was to confirm the Westminster theology. There was the addition of a new chapter entitled Of the Gospel, and of the Extent of the Grace Thereof. Other changes include a replacement to chapters 30 and 31 of the Westminster Confession concerned with Congregational church government. In these chapters the autonomy of local churches is asserted. It also included the words "Christ's active obedience" in chapter 11: Of Justification. While  "the assembly voting almost unanimously that both Christ’s active and passive obedience were necessary for justification", the words "active" as well as "whole" were omitted. Because exact wording is required  the Savoy Declaration makes this explicit.

References

Attribution

External links
Full text of the Declaration with differences from the Westminster Confession of Faith

1650s
Reformed confessions of faith
Congregationalism
1658 books
Puritanism in England